Rick Potter (born March 10, 1938) is a former Canadian football player who played for the Winnipeg Blue Bombers and Toronto Argonauts. He won the Grey Cup with Winnipeg in 1958, 1959, 1961 and 1962. He played junior football in Toronto previously.

References

1938 births
Toronto Argonauts players
Winnipeg Blue Bombers players
Living people
Sportspeople from Milwaukee
Players of American football from Wisconsin